August Harris Fisher (October 21, 1885 – April 8, 1972) was a Major League Baseball catcher who played in   and  with the Cleveland Naps and the New York Highlanders. He batted left and threw right-handed. Fisher had a .254 career batting average.

He was born in Pottsboro, Texas and died in Portland, Oregon.

External links

1885 births
1972 deaths
Major League Baseball catchers
Baseball players from Texas
New York Highlanders players
Cleveland Naps players
Minor league baseball managers
Waco Navigators players
Zanesville Infants players
Portland Beavers players
Sacramento Senators players
Spokane Indians players
Oklahoma City Indians players